Thomas Sipple House, also known as the Chipman House and Boxwood Manor, is a historic home located at Georgetown, Sussex County, Delaware.  It was built in 1861, and is a two-story, five bay, single pile frame dwelling with a two-story rear ell. It sits on a brick foundation and has a low-pitched gable roof.  The house was modified in 1912, to enclose a rear porch, add a sleeping porch, and add a two-story porch connecting the house to two outbuildings. It features Greek Revival and Italianate style design elements.

The site was added to the National Register of Historic Places in 1985.

References

Houses on the National Register of Historic Places in Delaware
Houses completed in 1861
Greek Revival houses in Delaware
Italianate architecture in Delaware
Houses in Georgetown, Delaware
1861 establishments in Delaware
National Register of Historic Places in Sussex County, Delaware